The 2017–18 Dartmouth Big Green men's basketball team represented Dartmouth College during the 2017–18 NCAA Division I men's basketball season. The Big Green, led by second-year head coach David McLaughlin, played their home games at Leede Arena in Hanover, New Hampshire as members of the Ivy League. They finished the season 7–20, 3–11 in Ivy League play to finish in last place and fail to qualify for the Ivy League tournament.

Previous season
The Big Green finished the 2016–17 season 7–20, 4–10 in Ivy League play to finish in a three-way tie for last place. They failed to qualify for the inaugural Ivy League tournament.

Offseason

Departures

2017 recruiting class

2018 recruiting class

Roster

Schedule and results

|-
!colspan=9 style=| Regular season

Source

References

Dartmouth Big Green men's basketball seasons
Dartmouth
Dart
Dart